"Wake Me Up When September Ends" is a song by American rock band Green Day, released on June 13, 2005, as the fourth single from the group's seventh studio album, American Idiot (2004). The acoustic ballad was written by frontman Billie Joe Armstrong about the death of his father when he was 10 years old.

The song became a hit single, peaking at number six on the US Billboard Hot 100. It was also a top-10 single in the United Kingdom, Belgium, and New Zealand and was a number-one single in the Czech Republic. In the United States, the song became symbolic after Hurricane Katrina, where it was dedicated to victims of the disaster, and also regarded as a dedication to the victims of the September 11 attacks that occurred in 2001. The song was certified platinum by the Recording Industry Association of America.

The song's music video depicts a couple broken apart by the Iraq War, which was intended to convey the song's central theme of loss.

Background
"Wake Me Up When September Ends" was written by frontman Billie Joe Armstrong about his father, who died from esophageal cancer when Armstrong was 10 years old. Armstrong at one point dubbed the song the most autobiographical he had written to that point, considering it "therapeutic" but also difficult to perform.

The song is notable in that it is largely unrelated to the storyline that runs throughout the rest of the album.

Commercial performance
The single peaked at number six in the United States, becoming Green Day's second top-10 single. It also peaked at number eight in Canada and the UK, while reaching number 13 in Australia. The song was certified Gold in the United Kingdom for sales of 400,000. The song ended the streak of Green Day's three consecutive number-one hits on the Modern Rock Tracks chart ("American Idiot", "Boulevard of Broken Dreams", and "Holiday"), but it peaked at number two on the chart, kept from number one by Gorillaz' "Feel Good Inc." The song also made it to number two on the Adult Top 40 chart and the Mainstream Top 40 chart. This was the band's most successful song in the adult contemporary market, hitting number three on the Adult Contemporary Chart and their only song to appear on that specific chart other than "Boulevard of Broken Dreams".

"Wake Me Up When September Ends" had sold 1,652,000 copies as of May 2010.

Reception
Rob Sheffield of Rolling Stone deemed the song a sequel to the group's 1997 single "Good Riddance (Time of Your Life)".

Music video
The song's music video was directed by Samuel Bayer, best known for his work with Nirvana and Metallica. Bayer wrote the treatment for the video, which he envisioned as a mini-movie. Bayer brought the idea of an Iraq War-themed video to the trio after interviewing soldiers who had signed up to fight after being persuaded by a television advertisement. The song's music video thus attempts to "turn the machine on itself" by acting as a commercial for "free thought or peace." Although it was far from the song's literal meaning, Armstrong felt it appropriate considering the song's theme of loss. Bayer noted that he felt bored with predictable music videos, and wanted to produce a video that felt like a film. Consequently, he and a crew spent a month casting actors for the roles and conducted rehearsals, uncommon for music videos. The clip was filmed in Los Angeles in late March 2005.

The video focuses on a couple in love (played by Jamie Bell and Evan Rachel Wood). The boyfriend promises never to leave his girlfriend but they later argue when the boyfriend enlists in the United States Marine Corps. The boyfriend interprets his actions as a way to show her that he loves her so much that he would put his life on the line to keep her safe. However, the girlfriend is heartbroken, as he broke his vow to never leave her. The video then shows the boyfriend in battle in Iraq being ambushed by insurgents. Despite the Marines fighting back, the boyfriend watches as several of his comrades fall to the ground wounded. Their fate—and his—is left unknown. This scene is intercut with scenes of the girlfriend tearfully mourning in a quiet field. The video ends on this juxtaposition, emphasizing the pain and heartache of losing loved ones due to the war.

The clip prompted criticism from conservative media pundits. On the subject of the clip being seen as exploitive of the war for entertainment purposes, Green Day's Mike Dirnt rejected this notion: "Rock & roll should be dangerous. […] It should be striking and stir questions, and I think that that video, at the end of the day, comes down to that core emotion of loss." Bayer considered it his best production to that point, remarking, "'September' is hands down the greatest thing I've ever done."

The video reached number one on Total Request Live, and came in second for best video of the year in a 2005 Reader's Poll by Rolling Stone.

Legacy
"Wake Me Up When September Ends" became closely associated with Hurricane Katrina, which struck the Gulf Coast of the United States on August 29, 2005, three days before the start of September. "Wake Me Up When September Ends" became symbolic in the aftermath; one blogger paired the song with television coverage of the disaster, creating a viral video. Green Day performed the song days after the disaster on ReAct Now: Music & Relief, a benefit concert broadcast on MTV and its associated properties.

A live version of the song, recorded on September 3, 2005, at Gillette Stadium in Foxborough, Massachusetts, was released soon after and dedicated to the hurricane's victims.

The song was performed live with U2 guitarist The Edge in the pregame show of the Monday Night Football game between the New Orleans Saints and the Atlanta Falcons; it was the first game played in the Superdome in New Orleans after the hurricane.

Annual internet meme 
Internet memes have circulated on social media between the dates of September 30 and October 1, featuring captions ordering Armstrong to wake up because September has ended, a literal interpretation of the song's title. Armstrong has expressed his displeasure with the memes and has joked about wanting to write a sequel song in response called "Shut the Fuck Up When October Begins".

Track listings

UK 7-inch picture disc

Charts

Weekly charts

Year-end charts

Certifications

Release history

References

2003 songs
2005 singles
Green Day songs
American Idiot
Music videos directed by Samuel Bayer
Number-one singles in the Czech Republic
Reprise Records singles
Rock ballads
Song recordings produced by Rob Cavallo
Commemoration songs
Songs written by Billie Joe Armstrong
Warner Records singles
Songs written by Mike Dirnt
Songs written by Tré Cool
2000s ballads